Radar is an acronym for RAdio Detection And Ranging.  

Radar may also refer to:

RADAR acronym
 Research on Adverse Drug Events and Reports (abbreviated RADAR), a pharmacological organization
 The Royal Association for Disability Rights (abbreviated RADAR)

Entertainment
 "Radar" (song), a 2009 single by Britney Spears
 "Radar", a song by Laurie Anderson from Home of the Brave
 "Radar", a song by Morphine from their album Yes
 "Radar", a musical piece by Bernard Herrmann on The Day the Earth Stood Still soundtrack
 Radar Records, a record label
 Radar, an album by Jorge Drexler
 Radar, a band of Sonny Condell
 Radar (magazine)
 Radar (radio station), an Australian radio station

People
 Te Radar, New Zealand comedian and television personality
 Nickname of Al Arbour (1932–2015), National Hockey League player and coach
 Radar O'Reilly, character in the M*A*S*H franchise, see List of M*A*S*H characters#Radar O'Reilly

Other uses
 Radar.net, a photo sharing website and application that allowed users to share pictures and videos
 RADAR (audio recorder), a product line of multitrack digital audio recorders
 RADAR, Geely's pick-up truck brand